Tachina praeceps is a species of fly in the genus Tachina of the family Tachinidae that can be found in such European countries as Austria, Bulgaria, Czech Republic, France, Germany, Greece (including  Crete), Hungary, Italy, Malta, Moldova, Poland, Romania, Russia, Slovakia, Spain, Switzerland, Ukraine, and all states of former Yugoslavia (except for Bosnia and Herzegovina).

References

Insects described in 1824
Diptera of Europe
praeceps